Ilya Vladimirovich Kungurov (born 26 June 1989) is a Russian former football goalkeeper.

Club career
He made his Russian Football National League debut for FC Zvezda Irkutsk on 14 October 2008 in a game against FC Volga Ulyanovsk.

References

External links
 
 

1989 births
Living people
Russian footballers
FC Zvezda Irkutsk players
Russian expatriate footballers
Expatriate footballers in Mongolia
Association football goalkeepers
FC Baikal Irkutsk players